Kim Soo-ok (born 13 August 1961) is a South Korean former tennis player.

Kim, who played at Wimbledon as a junior, featured regularly for the South Korea Federation Cup team in the 1980s, winning 19 matches, 11 in singles and eight in doubles.

A two-time individual medalist at the Asian Games, Kim finished with a silver medal behind Etsuko Inoue at the 1982 games in New Delhi and a bronze at 1986 games in Seoul. She won three team medals as well, which included a gold medal in 1982.

References

External links
 
 
 

1961 births
Living people
South Korean female tennis players
Asian Games medalists in tennis
Asian Games gold medalists for South Korea
Asian Games silver medalists for South Korea
Asian Games bronze medalists for South Korea
Medalists at the 1978 Asian Games
Medalists at the 1982 Asian Games
Medalists at the 1986 Asian Games
Tennis players at the 1978 Asian Games
Tennis players at the 1982 Asian Games
Tennis players at the 1986 Asian Games
Universiade medalists in tennis
Universiade bronze medalists for South Korea